Börse may refer to:

Stock exchanges
Deutsche Börse
Wiener Börse
Berliner Börse
Börse München
Börse Stuttgart
Frankfurt Stock Exchange

Other
The Stock Exchange (book) (Die Börse)

See also
Bourse (disambiguation)
List of European stock exchanges
Eurex